Lenox Dial Baker Sr. (November 10, 1902 – June 2, 1995) was an American orthopedic surgeon and athletic trainer at both Duke University and University of Tennessee. The Lenox Baker Children's Hospital at Duke is named in his honor. He graduated from the Duke University School of Medicine, where he was later a professor.

He was the first director (later secretary) of the North Carolina Department of Human Resources (later renamed the North Carolina Department of Health and Human Services).

Baker was inducted into the North Carolina Sports Hall of Fame in 1983.

References

External links
NC Sports Hall of Fame
Lenox D. Baker Papers at Duke University Medical Center Archives

State cabinet secretaries of North Carolina
American orthopedic surgeons
University of Tennessee alumni
Duke University School of Medicine alumni
Duke University faculty
1902 births
1995 deaths
20th-century American politicians
20th-century surgeons